The Merry Mayhem Tour was a co-headlining tour featuring Ozzy Osbourne and Rob Zombie that occurred in the fall and winter of 2001. When the tour was initially mentioned in September 2001, it was dubbed the Black Christmas Tour featuring support by Cradle of Filth. By early October, the tour was officially announced as the Merry Mayhem Tour, renamed due to the recent September 11 attacks, and would feature support from Mudvayne and Soil. The tour was set to hit 33 cities, beginning on Halloween and ending on New Year's Eve. Osbourne broke his leg while slipping when stepping out of the shower, resulting in 10 dates, scheduled between November 9 and November 24, being postponed. Later, the final three dates on the tour were cancelled, the final date due to more fallout from the September 11 attacks and the two preceding dates due to routing problems.. Therefore, the tour ended on December 23 with only 20 of the planned 33 dates occurring.

Personnel

Ozzy Osbourne
 Ozzy Osbourne — Vocals
 Zakk Wylde – Guitar
 Robert Trujillo – Bass
 Mike Bordin – Drums

Rob Zombie
 Rob Zombie — Vocals
 Mike Riggs - Guitar
 Blasko - Bass
 John Tempesta - Drums

Tour dates

References

Ozzy Osbourne concert tours
Rob Zombie concert tours
2001 concert tours